This Heat were an English experimental rock band, formed in early 1976 in Camberwell, London by multi-instrumentalists Charles Bullen (guitar, clarinet, viola, vocals, tapes), Charles Hayward (drums, keyboards, vocals, tapes) and Gareth Williams (keyboard, guitar, bass, vocals, tapes).

This Heat were active in the ascendancy of British punk, but stood apart from that scene due to an experimental and confrontational approach. This Heat's commercial success was limited, and their discography consisted of only two albums and an EP. The band would influence genres such as post-punk, industrial music, and post-rock.

Williams died of cancer in 2001. From 2016 until 2019, Bullen and Hayward reunited, playing under the name This Is Not This Heat.

History
This Heat first came together in 1976 by Charles Hayward and Charles Bullen. Hayward was a member of the progressive rock band Quiet Sun, fronted by guitarist Phil Manzanera of Roxy Music. In 1975, Quiet Sun had signed a deal with Island Records to record an album entitled Mainstream. Whilst touring to support the record, Manzanera stepped down as his commitments with Roxy Music were taking up his schedule, so Bullen stepped in as a replacement. Quiet Sun dissolved shortly afterwards, but Bullen and Hayward, who had bonded over their similar tastes and attitude to music making, decided to continue working together. 

After playing in a variety of improvisational groups such as Dolphin Logic and Friendly Rifles, they were joined by visual artist Gareth Williams, who despite his lack of formal musical training had an intuitive ear for sound. Hayward had also hoped to bring Quiet Sun bassist Bill MacCormick on board; MacCormick however, declined due to personality clashes between him and Williams. The trio settled upon the name This Heat in reference to the 1976 British Isles heat wave, regarded at the time as the hottest summer on record. 

This Heat's first radio airplay came in early 1977 from legendary DJ John Peel, to whom they sent a demo tape recorded in the top room at Hayward's parents' house in Camberwell, prior to moving into their 'Cold Storage' studio — a disused cold storage room converted into a studio, which was part of an "Acme Studios" artists studios complex in Brixton. During this time, they also recorded a session with Ghanaian percussionist Mario Boyer Diekuuroh, parts of which later appeared on a 1982 split cassette with Albert Marcoeur, released by the French experimental rock magazine Tago Mago.

Their self-titled debut album was recorded between February 1976 and September 1978 in various studios and venues, and was released in August 1979. It was characterised by heavy use of tape manipulation and looping (especially on the track "24 Track Loop" which was a loop actually on the 2" master tape), combined with more traditional performance (including quite a lot of live stereo microphone in the room recordings) to create dense, eerie, electronic soundscapes. Shortly thereafter, This Heat released the Health and Efficiency EP, which foreshadowed the more rock-oriented sound of their subsequent album.

This Heat then signed a record deal with Rough Trade Records, who released Deceit, the band's second and final album, in 1981. Whilst maintaining their experimental approach, Deceit found the band incorporating more coherent song structures, and consolidating the dub and world music influences in their work. The album was produced with help from noted reggae mixer Martin Frederick. Although at the time, like all of This Heat's releases, it sold poorly, Deceit is now seen as a classic of the post-punk era. By that time Deceit was released, Williams had exited from the band, departing for India to study kathakali.

This Heat split up in 1982 after completing their final European tour with bassist-vocalist Trefor Goronwy and keyboardist Ian Hill joining Bullen and Hayward. Hayward went on to form Camberwell Now with Goronwy and Stephen Rickard, and remains musically active. Bullen had a solo venture called Lifetones, and released one record, For a Reason, in 1983 on his Tone of Life imprint and in 1998 released the album Internal Clock under the name Circadian Rhythms. Williams later formed Flaming Tunes with Mary Currie and released a cassette of material, which was later released on CD.

In 1993 a new album of previously unreleased This Heat recordings was unearthed. Repeat featured three long tracks, including the title track, a 20-minute remix of "24 Track Loop". Out of Cold Storage, a box set of all the band's official recordings, was released in June 2006 on This is!, a new Recommended Records sub-label set up by Hayward and Bullen to re-release This Heat's back catalogue. The set comprises This Heat, Deceit, Health and Efficiency, Made Available and Repeat, plus Live 80/81, a CD of concert recordings.

In December 2001 This Heat tentatively rehearsed (with Williams); however, nothing came to fruition as Williams died later that month of cancer.

In 2016, Bullen and Hayward reunited under the name This Is Not This Heat to perform a number of critically acclaimed gigs in London. The concerts featured several guests such as Thurston Moore, Alexis Taylor, Alex Ward and Daniel O'Sullivan. The reunion continued across the following three years, concluding with a small series of shows in London, New York, and Los Angeles in 2019.

In August 2020, This Heat released part of its catalogue digitally on streaming services, including Bandcamp.

Legacy

Influence

Bands and artists that have called This Heat either an influence or a favourite include Steve Albini, Alexis Taylor, Dan Snaith, Avey Tare, Amen Dunes, Women, Preoccupations, Nurse With Wound, Palm, Squid, Mark Stewart, The Dead C, Daniel O'Sullivan, Disco Inferno, Elias Rønnenfelt, Marc Hollander, Family Fodder, Matt Johnson, 23 Skidoo, David Grubbs, Volcano the Bear, Dazzling Killmen, Nisennenmondai, Korekyojinn, Steven Wilson, The Sound of Animals Fighting, Yoshida Tatsuya, 75 Dollar Bill, Horse Lords, Mika Taanila, FRIGS, Warm Ghost, Justin Pearson, Bo Ningen, Pinkish Black, Young Knives, AIDS Wolf, Controlled Bleeding, These New Puritans, Eyeless in Gaza, Six Finger Satellite, Trans Am, Dave Kerman, Guapo, Chrome Hoof, Ut, Heiner Goebbels, and many others.

In addition, numerous critics recognised the band's influence on the music of Sonic Youth, Glenn Branca, Public Image Ltd., Radiohead, Swans, Black Dice, Stereolab, Gang Gang Dance, Lightning Bolt, C. Spencer Yeh, Liars, Black Midi and several other experimental and post-rock bands.

Covers & tributes

Both Sleepytime Gorilla Museum and Oneida have covered the track "S.P.Q.R.".
Robert Del Naja, one of the founding members of Massive Attack, covered "24 Track Loop".
K K Null covered the tracks "Repeat" and "Horizontal Hold".
Odd Nosdam remixed "Health And Efficiency" along with "Radio Prague".
Subtle remixed "A New Kind of Water".
The band were amongst the artists listed in LCD Soundsystem's "Losing My Edge".

Discography

Studio albums
This Heat (1979)
Deceit (1981)

EPs
Health and Efficiency (1980)
The Peel Sessions (1988)

Live
This Heat Live (1986; cassette-only release of 1980 Krefeld concert)
Scala (2006; bootleg 1979 London concert)
Final Revelations (2007; final 1982 concert plus songs from Solo Projects from each bandmember respectively)
Live at I.C.A. Club 1980 (2007; bootleg of concert at London's Institute of Contemporary Arts)

Compilations
Made Available: John Peel Sessions (1996; reissue of The Peel Sessions with bonus tracks)
Out of Cold Storage (2006; 6-CD box set)

Various artist compilation appearances

Recommended Records Sampler  (1982)

Other releases
This Heat with Mario Boyer Diekuuroh (1982; split cassette with Albert Marcoeur)
Repeat (1993)
John Peel Shows (2005; bootleg of 1977 preview of first album demos)
Face Hand Shy: Rarities (2006; above Peel demos plus "Health & Efficiency", Mario Boyer Diekuuroh tracks and undated live tracks)

References

External links

British industrial music groups
English progressive rock groups
English post-punk music groups
Rough Trade Records artists
Musical groups established in 1976
Musical groups disestablished in 1982
Musical groups from London
English experimental rock groups
Underground punk scene in the United Kingdom
Political music groups